Hisarcık is a village in the İnhisar District, Bilecik Province, Turkey. Its population is 53 (2021).

References

Villages in İnhisar District